Nghĩa Hành is a rural district (huyện) of Quảng Ngãi province in the South Central Coast region of Vietnam. As of 2003 the district had a population of 98,156. The district covers an area of 234 km². The district capital lies at Chợ Chùa.

References

Districts of Quảng Ngãi province